Casilda is a genus of moths in the family Geometridae erected by Ramón Agenjo Cecilia in 1952.

Species
 Casilda antophilaria (Hübner, 1813)
 Casilda consecraria (Staudinger, 1871)
 Casilda rosearia (Treitschke, 1828)

References

External links

Rhodometrini